Palaeophanes xoutha is a species of moth in the family Arrhenophanidae. It is only known from Malaysia.

The length of the forewings is about 6 mm for males.

Etymology
The specific name is derived from the Greek xouthos (yellowish brown), in reference to the predominantly yellowish-brown color of the adult.

External links
Family Arrhenophanidae

Arrhenophanidae
Moths described in 2003